This is a list of the earliest films produced in Sweden, mostly silent films before 1930. For an A-Z see :Category:Swedish films.

References

External links
 Swedish film at the Internet Movie Database

1910s
Films
Swedish
Films
Swedish